Hits Volume 1 (sometimes referred to as YouTube Hits Vol. 1) is the debut studio album by American musical group The Piano Guys. It was self-released in December 2011 as a means to distribute high quality audio recordings of their most popular YouTube videos at the time. Many of the songs have since been re-released on The Piano Guys and The Piano Guys 2.

The final two tracks are listed as only available on the Limited Founder's Edition, but following The Piano Guys' record deal with Sony Masterworks, no other version of the album was released.

Track listing

Notes

Personnel
Per liner notes
The Piano Guys
Steven Sharp Nelson – Cello Guy
Jon Schmidt – Piano Guy
Al van der Beek – Music Guy
Paul Anderson – "The" Guy
Tel Stewart – Video Guy
Shaye Scott – Video Guy

Additional musicians
Julie Nelson, Catherine Bohman, Alyssa Powers, Amy Talbot – Choir on "O Fortuna"

Charts

Weekly charts

Year-end charts

References 

2011 debut albums
2011 classical albums
Self-released albums
The Piano Guys albums